Vladimir Valerevich Delba is a politician from Abkhazia, who served as acting Prime Minister, Finance Minister and Vice Premier in the Government of President Ankvab.

After serving as Deputy Minister for Finance in the Government of President Bagapsh, Delba was appointed Finance Minister and Vice Premier by Alexander Ankvab on 10 October 2011.

On 2 June 2014, following Leonid Lakerbaia's resignation as a result of the 2014 Abkhazian political crisis, Vladimir Delba was appointed acting Prime Minister. After the Election of President Raul Khajimba, he was succeeded by Beslan Butba on 29 September.

References

1974 births
Living people
Prime Ministers of Abkhazia
Vice Premiers of Abkhazia
Ministers for Finance of Abkhazia